Paraxenetus is a genus of plant bugs in the family Miridae. There are about 17 described species in Paraxenetus.

Species
These 17 species belong to the genus Paraxenetus:

 Paraxenetus albonotatus Carvalho, 1988
 Paraxenetus alvarengai Carvalho & Ferreira, 1973
 Paraxenetus annulicornis Reuter, 1907
 Paraxenetus aspersus Carvalho & Ferreira, 1973
 Paraxenetus bahianus Carvalho & Ferreira, 1973
 Paraxenetus bracteatus (Distant, 1883)
 Paraxenetus brailovskyi Schaffner & Carvalho, 1985
 Paraxenetus brasilianus Carvalho & Ferreira, 1973
 Paraxenetus cuiabanus Carvalho & Ferreira, 1973
 Paraxenetus cuneopunctatus Carvalho, 1988
 Paraxenetus guttulatus (Uhler, 1887)
 Paraxenetus minusculus Carvalho & Ferreira, 1973
 Paraxenetus paranaensis Carvalho & Ferreira, 1973
 Paraxenetus pirapora Carvalho & Wallerstein, 1978
 Paraxenetus rubricuneus Carvalho, 1988
 Paraxenetus seabrai Carvalho & Ferreira, 1973
 Paraxenetus trifasciatus Carvalho & Wallerstein, 1978

References

Further reading

External links

 

Miridae genera
Articles created by Qbugbot
Herdoniini